Scottish Rowing  (SR), formerly the Scottish Amateur Rowing Association, is the governing body for the sport of rowing in Scotland.  It is responsible for promoting the sport in Scotland and also for selecting crews to send to the Home International Regatta and the Commonwealth Rowing Championships. In addition, Scottish Rowing also runs three of the major regattas of the year, Strathclyde Park Regatta, the Scottish Rowing Championships and the Scottish Indoor Rowing Championships.

Affiliated clubs 
 Aberdeen Boat Club
 Aberdeen Schools Rowing Association
 Aberdeen University Boat Club 
 Castle Semple Rowing Club
 Clyde Amateur Rowing Club
 Clydesdale Amateur Rowing Club 
 Crichton University Campus Boat Club
 Dundee University Boat Club
 Edinburgh University Boat Club
 George Heriots School Rowing Club
 George Watsons College Rowing Club 
 Glasgow Academy Boat Club
 Glasgow Rowing Club
 Glasgow Schools Rowing Club
 Glasgow University Boat Club
 Heriot-Watt University Boat Club
 Inverness Rowing Club 
 Loch Lomond Rowing Club 
 Nithsdale Amateur Rowing Club
 Robert Gordon University Boat Club
 St Andrew Boat Club
 Stirling Rowing Club
 Stirling University Boat Club 
 Strathclyde Park Rowing Club
 Strathclyde University Boat Club 
 University of St Andrews Boat Club

Categories

Senior 
Within the senior category of racing, depending on the average number of racing points of the crew, or the number of points of the rower (1x), a rower may compete in a number of categories: Novice (0 wins), Restricted 2 (up to 2 points), Restricted 1 (up to 6 points), Open (up to 12 points, the maximum).

Junior 
There are a number of junior categories (J12, J13, J14, J15, J16, J17 and J18). The number represents the age competitors must be less than before the first day of September preceding the event.

Masters 
A rower is eligible to compete at masters level from the year in which they turn 27 years old. Once a rower turns 27 they can race in the category Masters A, the categories change as the crew age increases (Mas B - 36; Mas C - 43; Mas D - 50; Mas E - 55; Mas F - 60; Mas G - 65; Mas H - 70; Mas I - 75; Mas J - 80+).

Lightweight 
A lightweight male is one whose individual weight does not exceed 72.5 kg (average crew weight 70 kg) and a lightweight female is one whose individual weight does not exceed 59 kg (average crew weight 57.5 kg).

Performance Programme 
Scottish Rowing, funded by sportscotland, invests into a number of university-based rowing programmes with a view to supporting the development of talented Under 23 rowers.

The universities on this programme have made a commitment to work in partnership with Scottish Rowing to establish a high performance programme led by a full-time professional rowing coach and supported by first class support services.

Admission to the rowing programme at these universities is based on merit and entry is not exclusively restricted to students. A significant focus of the rowing programme is on talent identification and development working closely with the GB Rowing Team Start programme.

Currently Scottish Rowing invests in the following university rowing programmes:

University of Aberdeen / Robert Gordon University
University of Edinburgh
University of Glasgow

External links
Scottish Rowing
Scottish Rowing (Facebook Page)
Scottish Rowing (Twitter Page)

References

Rowing in Scotland
Rowing governing bodies
Rowing